Hus or HUS may refer to:

Medicine
 Hemolytic-uremic syndrome, a disease characterized by haemolytic anemia, kidney problems and a low platelet count

People
 Hus (surname)
 Hus family, an 18th-century French dynasty of ballet dancers and actors

Transport
 Hughes Airport (Alaska), by IATA code
 Sikorsky HUS, a piston-engined military helicopter used by the United States Navy

Organisations
 Croatian Trade Union Association 
 Harlington Upper School, in Harlington, Bedfordshire, England
 Humboldtschule, Bad Homburg, a German gymnasium in Bad Homburg vor der Höhe, Hesse

Other
 hus, an Old English -and modern Scandinavian- word for 'house'
 ǁHus, a Namibian mancala game
 Huastec language, a Mayan language of Mexico
 Hebdometre–undecimogramme–second system, a historic system of units better known as quadrant–eleventh-gram–second system (QES) (see also: hebdo-)

See also 
 Huss (disambiguation)
 Hoos, a surname